Egginton Junction railway station is a disused railway station in Egginton, Derbyshire.

History 
In January 1878 the Great Northern Railway (GNR) opened on its GNR Derbyshire and Staffordshire Extension which made a junction with the NSR at Egginton. Initially there was no provision for GNR trains to stop at Egginton station so the two companies agreed to build a new station situated at the junction of the two lines. It was arranged in the angle of the junction, with platforms for the trains of both railways, and was opened on 1 July 1878.

The new station was provided with substantial brick buildings: a two-storey station master's house and the usual single storey offices on the main platform in the vee of the junction, with small timber-built waiting room on the other platforms.

Regular passenger traffic on the GNR line from Friargate finished in 1939, although it saw excursions until 1959.  The station then closed in 1962. The Egginton Dairy creamery had a dedicated siding for the dispatch of milk trains around the country, until the mid-1960s.

Present day 

The line from Friargate remained open for some years, being used as a test track by the British Rail Research Division. The station area was leased by a caravan dealer who later moved on. By 1974 the main station was derelict and would have been pulled down had not a building company bought it in 1978 and renovated it for use as offices. The NSR side of the station has disappeared, apart from the signal box which is still in use to supervise a level crossing and to act as the 'fringe' to Derby PSB.

References

Further reading

 

Disused railway stations in Derbyshire
Rail junctions in England
Railway stations in Great Britain opened in 1878
Railway stations in Great Britain closed in 1962
Former North Staffordshire Railway stations
Former Great Northern Railway stations